Diastomatidae is a family of sea snails, marine gastropod molluscs in the superfamily Cerithioidea.

According to the taxonomy of the Gastropoda by Bouchet & Rocroi (2005) the family Diastomatidae has no subfamilies.

Genera 

Genera in the family Diastomatidae include:

 Aneurychilus Cossmann, 1889
 Diastoma Deshayes, 1850 - type genus of the family Diastomatidae, the type species of this genus is extinct
 † Diastoma acuminiense Cossmann, 1882 or Diastoma acumininense Cossmann, 1882
 † Diastoma costellatum (Lamarck, 1804) - type species, from Eocene of the Paris Basin
 † Diastoma elaenia Olsson, 1929
 † Diastoma elongatum Brongniart, 1823
 † Diastoma insulaemaris Pilsbry & Harbison, 1933
 Diastoma melanioides (Reeve, 1849) - it is the only extant species of this family
 † Diastoma multispiratum Cossmann, 1881
 † Diastoma roncanum (Brongniart)
 † Diastoma sameri Abbass, 1967
 † Ewekoroia Adegoke, 1977 - the type species of this genus is extinct
 † Keilostoma Deshayes, 1850

References